Wolfspeed, Inc. is an American developer and manufacturer of wide-bandgap semiconductors, focused on silicon carbide and gallium nitride materials and devices for power and radio frequency applications such as transportation, power supplies, power inverters, and wireless systems. The company was formerly named Cree, Inc.

History

The company was founded in July 1987 in Durham, North Carolina. Five of the six founders – Neal Hunter, Thomas Coleman, John Edmond, Eric Hunter, John Palmour, and Calvin Carter – are graduates of North Carolina State University.

In 1983, the founders – one a research assistant professor and the others student researchers – were seeking ways to leverage the properties of silicon carbide to enable semiconductors to operate at higher operating temperatures and power levels. They also knew silicon carbide could serve as the diode in light-emitting diode (LED) lighting, a light source first demonstrated in 1907 with an electrically charged diode of silicon carbide. The research team devised a way to grow silicon crystals in the laboratory, and in 1987 founded the company to produce SiC to be used commercially in both semiconductors and lighting.

In 1989, the company introduced the first blue LED, enabling the development of large, full-color video screens and billboards.

In 1991, the company released the first commercial silicon carbide wafer.

In 1993, the company became a public company via an initial public offering.

In 1999, the company name was changed from Cree Research to Cree, Inc.

In 2011, the company acquired Ruud Lighting for $525 million.

In August 2011, the company announced the XLamp XT-E Royal Blue LED for use in remote phosphor lighting.

In 2013, the company's first consumer products, two household LED bulbs, qualified for Energy Star rating by the United States Environmental Protection Agency.

In July 2016, Infineon Technologies agreed to acquire the company's Wolfspeed RF and power electronics devices unit for $850 million. However, the deal was terminated in February 2017 due to regulators’ national security concerns.

In March 2018, the company acquired the RF Power Business Infineon Technologies AG's for €345 million.

In May 2019, the company sold its Lighting Products division to Ideal Industries.

In September 2019, the company announced a $1 billion investment in a semiconductor manufacturing plant in Marcy, New York to build the world’s largest silicon carbide fabrication facility with a $500 million grant from New York State.

In March 2021, the company sold its LED Business to SMART Global Holdings for up to $300 million.

In October 2021, the company changed its name to Wolfspeed.

In April 2022, the Marcy, New York, facility opened. New York Governor Kathy Hochul and US Senator Chuck Schumer spoke at the event.

In November 2022, the company announced that co-founder and Chief Technology Officer John Palmour had died.

Incidents 

On October 13, 2022 a facilities electrician was electrocuted at the Wolfspeed Research Triangle Park in Durham, North Carolina. The incident sparked a state investigation into his death as well as public concern for the company's poor work safety record. In the past 10 years, state Department of Labor investigations into the company have uncovered 17 workplace safety violations, including six serious violations. It is worth noting that during this same time period, the Raleigh NC OSHA office completed over 5,400 investigations that resulted in one or more violations for hundreds of other local companies.

References

External links

 

 
Official opening ceremony of upstate NY Fab.

1993 initial public offerings
American companies established in 1987
Companies based in Durham, North Carolina
Companies listed on the New York Stock Exchange
Electronics companies established in 1987
Electronics companies of the United States
Light-emitting diode manufacturers
Manufacturing companies based in North Carolina